Condoms, needles, and negotiation, also known as the CNN approach, is a harm reduction approach to reducing the rate of transmission of sexually transmitted infections such as HIV/AIDS by:
 Providing condoms and teaching negotiation of safer sex with partners
 Providing clean needles to reduce transmission from injection drug use

In contrast with the abstinence, be faithful, use a condom, or "ABC" approach to this problem, the "CNN" approach aims primarily at reducing the rate of transmission among high-risk groups such as women in areas where women have low levels of social power, prostitutes and their clients, and intravenous drug users.

Criticisms
Pope Benedict XVI has strongly criticized reduction policies with regards to HIV/AIDS, saying that "it is a tragedy that cannot be overcome by money alone, that cannot be overcome through the distribution of condoms, which even aggravates the problems". This position has been widely criticised for misrepresenting and oversimplifying the role of condoms in preventing infections. Other experts, including the Director of Harvard University's AIDS Prevention Research Project, have supported the Pope's position.

See also
HIV/AIDS in Brazil

External links 

Does 'CNN' (Condoms, Needles, Negotiation) Work Better than 'ABC' (Abstinence, Being Faithful and Condom Use) in Attacking the AIDS Epidemic?, S. Sinding, Guttmacher Institute

Sexual health
Harm reduction
HIV/AIDS